Hi-5 is an Australian children's television series, originally produced by Kids Like Us and later Southern Star for the Nine Network and created by Helena Harris and Posie Graeme-Evans. The program is known for its educational content, and for the cast of the program, who became a recognised musical group for children outside of the series, known collectively as Hi-5. It has generated discussion about what is considered appropriate television for children. The series premiered in April 1999 on the Nine Network and aired until 2011, before returning to Nine in 2017 with a revived series.

In Australia, Roadshow Entertainment have released selected songs and segments from the television series, compiled on VHS and later DVD, for home video consumption. Each compilation release usually featured three feature Songs of the Week and a range of segments from the corresponding television series, selected to reflect the specific theme of the video. In 2012 and 2013, selected full episodes were released on DVD. Roadshow also distributed three DVDs featuring Hi-5 performing live stage shows, entitled Hi-5 Live! The Playtime Concert (2009), Hi-5 Surprise! Live (2010) and Hi-5 Holiday! Live (2012). These releases did not feature any footage from the television series.

The home video releases were typically well received by the target audience. In its first three months, Move Your Body had sold 80,000 copies on VHS. Summer Rainbows was the highest selling VHS title for Australian children in 1999 and Star Dreaming was the most sold in 2000. The Summer Rainbows / Move Your Body double release was the highest selling DVD in 2003, and Surfing Safari was the highest selling VHS of the same year. Playing Cool (2001) was certified as double platinum by the time of its 2004 DVD release.

Compilation releases

Full episode releases

Special releases

Notes

References

Hi-5